1024 is the natural number following 1023 and preceding 1025.

1024 is a power of two: 2 (2 to the tenth power). It is the nearest power of two from decimal 1000 and senary 10000 (decimal 1296).

1024 is the smallest number with exactly 11 divisors (but note that there are smaller numbers with more than 11 divisors; e.g., 60 has 12 divisors) .

Approximation to 1000 

The neat coincidence that 210 is nearly equal to 103 provides the basis of a technique of estimating larger powers of 2 in decimal notation. Using 210a+b ≈ 2b103a(or 2a≈2a mod 1010floor(a/10) if "a" stands for the whole power) is fairly accurate for exponents up to about 100. For exponents up to 300, 3a continues to be a good estimate of the number of digits.

For example, 253 ≈ 8×1015. The actual value is closer to 9×1015.

In the case of larger exponents, the relationship becomes increasingly inaccurate, with errors exceeding an order of magnitude for a ≥ 97. For example:

In measuring bytes, 1024 is often used in place of 1000 as the quotients of the units byte, kilobyte, megabyte, etc. In 1999, the IEC coined the term kibibyte for multiples of 1024, with kilobyte being used for multiples of 1000.

Special use in computers 
In binary notation, 1024 is represented as 10000000000, making it a simple round number occurring frequently in computer applications.

1024 is the maximum number of computer memory addresses that can be referenced with ten binary switches. This is the origin of the organization of computer memory into 1024-byte chunks or kibibytes.

In the Rich Text Format (RTF), language code 1024 indicates the text is not in any language and should be skipped over when proofing. Most used languages codes in RTF are integers slightly over 1024.

1024×768 pixels and 1280×1024 pixels are common standards of display resolution.

See also 
 Powers of 1024

References 

Integers